Noqareh Chi Mahalleh (also Romanized as Noqāreh Chī Maḩalleh) is a village in Otaqvar Rural District, Otaqvar District, Langarud County, Gilan Province, Iran. At the 2006 census, its population was 129, in 38 families.

References 

Populated places in Langarud County